The 1970–71 Segunda División season was the 40th since its establishment and was played between 5 September 1970 and 6 June 1971.

Overview before the season
20 teams joined the league, including 3 relegated from the 1969–70 La Liga and 7 promoted from the 1969–70 Tercera División.

Relegated from La Liga
Deportivo La Coruña
Mallorca
Pontevedra

Promoted from Tercera División

Langreo
Real Santander
Logroñés
Villarreal
Hércules
Cádiz
Moscardó

Teams

League table

Top goalscorers

Top goalkeepers

Results

Relegation playoffs

First leg

Second leg

External links
BDFútbol

1970-71
2
Spain